Steve Waterman (born 8 September 1960) is a British jazz trumpeter, composer and educator.

Waterman was born in Lincolnshire and educated at Trinity College. He leads a quintet and 18-piece jazz orchestra, holds several teaching posts
and has co-authored a book on jazz trumpet method.

References
 Clarke, Donald (Ed.). The Penguin Encyclopedia of Popular Music, Viking, 1989.

External links
 Waterman's home page

1960 births
Living people
British jazz trumpeters
Male trumpeters
21st-century trumpeters
21st-century British male musicians
British male jazz musicians